Meltem Akar (born May 12, 1982) is a Turkish female boxer competing in the light flyweight (48 kg) division.

She is the daughter of Şenol Akar, who was between 1975-1980 an active amateur boxer in Giresun.

Meltem Akar started boxing in 2006. She is coached by Metin Kısa. At the 2011 Women's European Union Amateur Boxing Championships held in Katowice, Poland, she became champion.

Currently, she is a student of physical education and sports at the Black Sea Technical University.

See also
 List of female boxers

References

External links
 Meltem Akar at Awakening Fighters

Sportspeople from Giresun
Turkish women boxers
Living people
Karadeniz Technical University alumni
1982 births
Light-flyweight boxers
21st-century Turkish sportswomen
20th-century Turkish sportswomen